The Greater Bay Area International Sports and Cultural Center, or GBA Center, is an indoor arena located in Foshan, China. It is used mostly for basketball matches and concerts.

The arena opened on 10 November 2018 as the host of the 27th China Golden Rooster and Hundred Flowers Film Festival. On 2 December 2018, a 2019 FIBA Basketball World Cup qualification match contested by China and Lebanon was hold as the opening match. Guangzhou Loong Lions of Chinese Basketball Association appointed the arena as their second home arena and played six matches of 2018–19 CBA season in December 2018. Guangzhou Charge of the Overwatch League will also play at the arena from 2020 season. Selected games of Macau Black Bears, which also owned by Nenking Group, were played in the arena as well.

References

Indoor arenas in China
Basketball venues in China
Sports venues in Guangdong
Buildings and structures in Foshan
Sports venues completed in 2018
Esports venues in China
Nenking Group